Bruno Petrarca (26 December 1906 – 3 July 1977) was an Italian boxer who competed in the 1924 Summer Olympics. In 1924 he was eliminated in the quarter-finals of the featherweight class after losing his fight to the upcoming silver medalist Joseph Salas.

References

External links
 

1906 births
1977 deaths
Boxers from Rome
Featherweight boxers
Light-welterweight boxers
Olympic boxers of Italy
Boxers at the 1924 Summer Olympics
Italian male boxers
20th-century Italian people